Lautzenbrücken is an Ortsgemeinde – a community belonging to a Verbandsgemeinde – in the Westerwaldkreis in Rhineland-Palatinate, Germany.

Geography

Location
The community lies in the Westerwald between Limburg and Siegen on the boundary with North Rhine-Westphalia. Lautzenbrücken belongs to the Verbandsgemeinde of Bad Marienberg, a kind of collective municipality.
Its seat is in the like-named town.

Constituent communities
Lautzenbrücken has two outlying centres named Hohensayn und Eisenkaute.

History
In 1262, Lautzenbrücken had its first documentary mention as Luytzebrucke.

Politics

The municipal council is made up of 8 council members who were elected in a majority vote in a municipal election on 13 June 2004.

Economy and infrastructure

South of the community runs Bundesstraße 414, leading from Driedorf-Hohenroth to Hachenburg. The nearest Autobahn interchanges are in Siegen and Wilnsdorf on the A 45 (Dortmund–Hanau), some 20 km away. The nearest InterCityExpress stop is the railway station at Montabaur on the Cologne-Frankfurt high-speed rail line.

References

External links
 Lautzenbrücken
 Lautzenbrücken in the collective municipality’s Web pages 

Municipalities in Rhineland-Palatinate
Westerwaldkreis